The 1961 Penn Quakers football team was an American football team that represented the University of Pennsylvania during the 1961 NCAA University Division football season. Penn finished seventh in the Ivy League. 

In their second year under head coach John Stiegman, the Quakers compiled a 2–7 record and were outscored 194 to 42. Mike Natale was the team captain.

Penn's 1–6 conference record was the second-worst in the Ivy League standings. The Quakers were outscored 167 to 22 by Ivy opponents. 

Penn played its home games at Franklin Field adjacent to the university's campus in Philadelphia, Pennsylvania.

Schedule

References

Penn
Penn Quakers football seasons
Penn Quakers football